Cosmotoma nigra is a species of longhorn beetles of the subfamily Lamiinae. It was described by Gilmour in 1955, and is known from southern Brazil.

References

Beetles described in 1955
Cosmotoma